Oliver Gordon may refer to:

Oliver Gordon (Royal Navy officer), World War II officer and prisoner of war
Oliver Gordon (rugby league) (born 1992)
Oliver Gordon, stage name of English actor and cricketer Oliver Battcock (1903–1970)

See also
Gordon Oliver (disambiguation)